See More Business (26 April 1990 – 24 July 2014) was a top-class National Hunt chaser in the late 1990s and early 2000s.  He won the 1999 Cheltenham Gold Cup as well as the 1997 and 1999 King George VI Chase.

Background
See More Business was a bay horse with no white markings bred in Ireland by Ian Bryant. Born at Winnal Common in Herefordshire, he was trained by Paul Nicholls at Ditcheat in Somerset. He was ridden in to his biggest victories by Mick Fitzgerald and Andrew Thornton.

Racing career

Early career
See More Business ran in 3 point-to-points winning two and falling on his final start before making his debut under rules. He made his hurdling debut on 4 November 1995 at Chepstow with a win and followed with two further wins including the Grade 2 Winter Novices' Hurdle

He reappeared nearly a year later as a novice chaser.  He started by winning the Grade 2 Rising Stars Novices' Chase and then was second in a Grade 1 chase and then a Grade 2 chase to Dorans Pride.  He was a strongly fancied second favourite at 5/2 for the Racing Post Chase.  However, he suffered a heavy fall on the second circuit.

1997/98 season

See More Business returned the next season with a win in the Rehearsal Chase at Chepstow and then ran in the King George VI Chase. The joint favourities One Man and Suny Bay disappointed and coming to the last fence he was challenged by Challenger du Luc. He then went on to win the Pillar Chase at Cheltenham ahead of Cyborgo. He went into the Cheltenham Gold Cup as the second favourite behind old rival Dorans Pride. However, disaster struck as Cyborgo's jockey Tony McCoy felt his horse had suffered an injury and urgently tried to pull him up before the next fence. See More Business was running slightly wide of the field and when McCoy pulled Cyborgo out he gave See More Business nowhere to go and took him out of the race.

1998/99 season

See More Business' first run of the new season was in the Edward Hanmer Chase but he could only finish fourth. He then retained the Rehearsal Chase in a 3-runner field. He went into the King George VI Chase as the favourite but fared badly and was pulled up as Teeton Mill won. He ran again in the Pillar Chase but could only finish third of five behind new star Cyfor Malta and Go Ballistic. He was now the forgotten horse of the 1999 Gold Cup. His chances were made easier by Cyfor Malta suffering an injury and being unable to run and Teeton Mill suffering a career-ending injury early in the race and having to be pulled up. Towards the final three fences there were only four horses with a chance of winning. Double Thriller faded and then so did favourite Florida Pearl. The scene was set for a thrilling finish between See More Business and 66/1 outsider Go Ballistic. See More Business just prevailed by 1 length.

1999/2000 season

The following season See More Business went into the Cheltenham Gold Cup in fantastic form. He'd won the Charlie Hall Chase and defeated Go Ballistic by 17 lengths in winning the King George VI Chase for a second time. This was the last time the race was officially first-scheduled for Monday December 27; Christmas Sunday still being observed in the UK. Finally, he won the Aon Chase by 18 lengths. He went into the Gold Cup as the 9/4 favourite. However, no horse since L'Escargot had retained the crown and that had been nearly 30 years earlier. In the end he could only come fourth behind Looks Like Trouble, Florida Pearl and Strong Promise. However, he ended his season with a 21 lengths win in the Martell Cup Chase.

2000/01 season

See More Business' first port of call the next season was the Charlie Hall Chase where he defeated three rivals by 30 lengths. He then went into the King George VI Chase as the hot favourite with Looks Like Trouble injured. However, he had a dire race and finished a well-beaten fifth. He then won another Pillar Chase before running another disappointing race this time in the Martell Cup Chase (the Cheltenham Festival having been abandoned).

2001/02 season

The next year it looked like time would be called on See More Business' impressive career. He fell in the Rehearsal Chase and was pulled up in the Welsh National. He bounced back with a convincing win in the Jim Ford but it was a weak field. Still he lined up in that year's Cheltenham Gold Cup. To the racing public's delight he ran a wonderful race. He was unable to hold off Best Mate and Commanche Court but his third place showed him back towards his best. Sadly, he couldn't repeat the trick at Aintree and was well-beaten in the Martell Cup Chase.

Later career
See More Business' four races the following season were a mixed bag. He was defeated by More Than A Stroll in Down Royal, won another Rehearsal Chase and Jim Ford before coming well down the field in the Cheltenham Gold Cup.

See More Business' last race was on 6 December 2003 when he ran in another Rehearsal Chase.  He was behind on this occasion and went on to a well-deserved retirement.

Pedigree

References

1990 racehorse births
2014 racehorse deaths
Cheltenham Gold Cup winners
Cheltenham Festival winners
National Hunt racehorses
Racehorses bred in Ireland
Racehorses trained in the United Kingdom
Thoroughbred family 15-a